Jan Apell and Ken Flach were the defending champions, but did not participate this year.

Trevor Kronemann and David Macpherson won the title, defeating Luis Lobo and Javier Sánchez 4–6, 6–3, 6–4 in the final.

Seeds

  Sandon Stolle /  Mark Woodforde (semifinals)
  Jonas Björkman /  Henrik Holm (first round)
  Luis Lobo /  Javier Sánchez (final)
  John Fitzgerald /  Patrick Rafter (first round)

Draw

Draw

External links
 Main draw

Tennis Channel Open
1995 ATP Tour
1995 Tennis Channel Open